= Ammonium hexachlororhenate =

Names
- IUPAC name Ammonium hexachlororhenate(IV)
- Other names Diammonium hexachlororhenate(2-)

Identifiers
| CAS Number | 12051-87-5 |
| 3D model (JSmol) | Interactive image |
| ChemSpider | 21159975 |
| EC Number | 234-991-8 |
| PubChem CID | 92026590 |
- InChI: InChI=1S/6ClH.2H3N.Re/h6*1H;2*1H3;/q;;;;;;;;+4/p-4 Key: XJBVMCSHXBGWCE-UHFFFAOYSA-J
- SMILES: [NH4+].[NH4+].Cl[Re-2](Cl)(Cl)(Cl)(Cl)Cl

Properties
| Chemical formula | Cl_{6}H_{8}N_{2}Re |
| Molar mass | 434.99 g·mol^{−1} |
| Appearance | yellow-green solid |
| Density | 2.87 g/cm^{3} |
- Except where otherwise noted, data are given for materials in their standard state (at 25 °C [77 °F], 100 kPa). Infobox references

Ammonium hexachlororhenate is an inorganic chemical compound with the chemical formula (NH_{4})_{2}ReCl_{6}.

== Physical properties ==
Ammonium hexachlororhenate forms yellow-green crystals of cubic system, space group Fm3m.
